Saint-Charles-Borromée, Quebec (2021 Population 15,285) is a city in southwest-central Quebec, Canada, on the l'Assomption River. In Joliette Regional County Municipality, Saint-Charles-Borromée has the Maison Antoine-Lacombe, a heritage home that hosts many exhibits throughout the year. The town is also home to the Centre Saint-Jean-Bosco, which annually hosts the Mémoires et Racines Festival of folk music from various countries and Quebec.

The town takes its name from its original Roman Catholic parish, Saint-Charles-Borromée, which was canonically established in 1683. The parish, in turn, is named after the French form of the name of an Italian Roman Catholic prelate, Charles Borromeo (1538–1584). He was the archbishop of Milan, founded a Roman Catholic order, the Oblates, and became a canonised saint in the Roman Catholic calendar.

History 
In 1832, Barthélemy Joliette built a sawmill and a flour mill on the banks of the l'Assomption River. He was soon followed by pioneers from Saint-Ambroise-de-Kildare, Saint-Paul, and Sainte-Mélanie, who began to clear the area. In 1840, the parish Saint-Charles-Borromée was founded, and its canonical occurred in 1843.

Two years later was founded the parish municipality of Saint-Charles-Borromée-du-Village-d'Industrie from Joliette, which decided to separate from the rest of the town in 1864 and was first named L'Industrie. It ceased to exist in 1847, and its territory became part of Berthier County. The parish municipality of Saint-Charles-Borromée was created in 1855. In 1864, when Joliette was erected, Saint-Charles-Borromée lost an important part but still covered a large area.

In 1870, the parish of Saint-Alphonse-de-Liguori took a small part of the west. In 1915, Joliette decided to explain its territory from Saint-Charles-Borromée toward the north and the south. In 1956, the area east of the l'Assomption River decided to separate from Saint-Charles-Borromée, and it became Nortre-Dame-des-Prairies. In 1957, the south of Saint-Charles-Borromée decided to also separate itself and became the parish municipality of Saint-Charles-Borromée-Sud, which later merged with Joliette and became known with the name of "Quartier Base-de-Roc" and "Carrefour du Vieux-Moulin". That section also included the current location of the Galleries Joliette. Finally, the rest of Saint-Charles-Borromée, commonly known as "La Cité de Joliette," merged with Joliette in 1963.

The town became the municipality of Saint-Charles-Borromée in 1986 because Barthélemy Joliette's wife, Marie-Charlotte Tarieu Taillant de Lanaudière, had been largely implied with the construction of the local church. The town was supposed to be named after her, but there was no Sainte-Charlotte so they decided to masculinize the name to that of Saint-Charles-Borromée.

Demographics 

Public transportation 
The CTJM serves the area with public buses from 6:20 to 22:10 every week days and from 7:50 to 18:35 every week end days. There is 51 bus stop covering the city, including 7 bus shelter. all of them are connecting with Joliette's terminus on rue Fabre. This terminus will soon be moved to a safer area: rue Saint-Louis, Joliette, in front of the courthouse. The town most northern bus stop is situated on the corner of rue de la Visitation and rue du Curé-M.-Neyron

Health 

The Health and Social Services centre of Northern Lanaudiere (CSSSNL), commonly known as the CHRDL (Lanudiere Regional Hospital Center), is the regional hospital deserving the northern part of Lanaudiere. It is situated in the south part of Saint-Charles-Borromee.

Education 
Commission scolaire des Samares operates the francophone public schools.
 École secondaire de l'Espace-Jeunesse
 Saint-Charles-Borromée is the home of two francophone elementary schools: École Lorenzo-Gauthier— Rose-des-Vents (pavillon Lorenzo-Gauthier), on rue Deschênes and École de l'Espace-Jeunesse (pavillon la Traversée), (formerly Sainte-Marie) situated on boulevard Sainte-Anne. The first serves the west of the town. The second serves the east.

Sir Wilfrid Laurier School Board operates the anglophone public schools, including:
 Joliette Elementary School
On February 24, 2010, it was decided to transfer Joliette Elementary School from Saint-Paul to Saint-Charles-Borromée in a piece of land on the boulevard l'Assomption Ouest, at the corner of rue Pierre-de-Coubertin. It will be the first English school in Saint-Charles-Borromée and the only one in the county.
 Joliette High School in Joliette

Notable people 
 Farah Alibay, systems engineer at the NASA Jet Propulsion Laboratory who has worked on the InSight, Mars Cube One, and Mars 2020 missions.
 Mirianne Brûlé, actress

See also
List of cities in Quebec

References

External links 
 Town of Saint-Charles-Borromée
Festival Mémoires et Racines

Cities and towns in Quebec
Incorporated places in Lanaudière
Charles Borromeo